Trifolium fragiferum, the strawberry clover, is a herbaceous perennial plant species in the bean family Fabaceae. It is native to Europe, Asia, and parts of Africa. It is present in other places, such as sections of North America, as an introduced species. It is also cultivated as a cover crop and for hay and silage, as green manure, and as a bee plant.

Description
This is a perennial herb that spreads via stolons to form mats or clumps of herbage. The leaves are compound, each with three serrated oval leaflets up to 2 to 2.5 centimeters long. The inflorescence is a head of flowers around a centimeter long when first flowering. It increases in size to two centimeters as the fruits develop, the sepals becoming thin and inflated, fuzzy and pinkish in color, to resemble a strawberry or raspberry.

Uses
Strawberry clover is cultivated as a cover crop and for hay and silage, as green manure, and as a bee plant. It is good for cover on flood-prone lands or areas with soil salinity. It is known as a weed in some areas. Several agricultural cultivars have been developed, including 'Salina', 'Palestine', and 'Fresa'.

References

External links

Jepson Manual Treatment
Washington Burke Museum
Photo gallery

fragiferum
Fodder
Flora of Europe
Flora of Western Asia
Flora of North Africa
Plants described in 1753
Taxa named by Carl Linnaeus